Joseph W. Simpson (fl. 1890s) was an English footballer who made 70 appearances in the Football League playing for Lincoln City in three separate spells. He played as a full back. He also played for Midland League clubs Newark and Kettering, and for Lincoln-based club St Mary's.

Simpson had an eventful debut for Lincoln City. After 20 minutes of the visit to Darwen, goalkeeper John Broadbent suffered a broken bone in his shoulder, and Simpson replaced him in goal. He and Lincoln conceded a further five goals, to make the final score 6–0.

References

Year of birth missing
Year of death missing
Place of birth missing
English footballers
Association football fullbacks
Lincoln City F.C. players
Newark Town F.C. players
Kettering Town F.C. players
English Football League players
Midland Football League players
Place of death missing